The 2013–14 season was Southern District RSA's 12th competitive season and 2nd consecutive season in the Hong Kong First Division League, the top-tier division in Hong Kong football. Southern competed in the First Division League, Senior Challenge Shield and FA Cup in this season.

Starting in this season, the team was renamed Royal Southern for sponsorship reasons.

Key events
 17 May 2013: Spanish defender Rubén López García-Madrid and fellow forward Dieguito extend their contracts with the club.
 19 May 2013: The club confirms that they have completed the permanent transfer of Spanish forward Jonathan Carril from Kitchee after Carril spent almost the whole 2012–13 season on loan to the club.
 29 May 2013: Spanish forward Yago González joins the club from fellow First Division club Kitchee for free.
 29 May 2013: All local players except Tsang Chiu Tat and Tse Man Wing have extended their contracts with the club. The club also confirmed that Paul Ngue is free to join any club for free as they do not extend Ngue's contract.
 29 May 2013: The club confirms that Paul Ngue is excluded from the list of foreign players and is free to join any club for free.
 1 June 2013: Spanish defender Héctor Granado Gómez joins the club from CF Palencia for free. He previously played with Rubén López García-Madrid in the 2011–12 season.
 8 June 2013: Hong Kong midfielder Cheng Chi Wing leaves the club and joins newly promoted First Division club Happy Valley for an undisclosed fee.
 8 June 2013: Hong Kong defender To Philip Michael leaves the club and joins newly promoted First Division club Happy Valley for an undisclosed fee.
 11 June 2013: Hong Kong defender Tse Man Wing leaves the club and joins newly promoted First Division club Eastern Salon for free.
 17 June 2013: Hong Kong midfielder Ngan Lok Fung joins the club from fellow First Division club Kitchee on a season-long loan.
 21 June 2013: Chinese-born Hong Kong midfielder Che Runqiu joins the club from newly relegated Second Division club Wofoo Tai Po for free.
 23 June 2013: Hong Kong midfielder Lo Chi Kwan joins the club from fellow First Division club Kitchee on a season-long loan.
 8 July 2013: Ghana-born Naturalised Hong Kong defender Wisdom Fofo Agbo leaves the club and joins Chinese League One club Harbin Yiteng on a free transfer.
 18 July 2013: Hong Kong defender Tsang Chiu Tat leaves the club and joins fellow First Division club Tuen Mun on a free transfer.
 6 August 2013: Hong Kong goalkeeper Tsang Man Fai joins the club on loan from fellow First Division club South China until the end of the season.
 7 August 2013: Hong Kong defender Li Ngai Hoi joins the club on loan from fellow First Division club Kitchee until the end of the season.
 17 January 2014: Hong Kong striker James Ha joins the club on loan from fellow First Division club Kitchee until the end of the season.
 17 January 2014: Hong Kong defender Pak Wing Chak joins the club on loan from fellow First Division club Eastern Salon until the end of the season.
 22 January 2014: Hong Kong defender Li Ngai Hoi returns to Kitchee after 4 months loan spell with the club.
 28 January 2014: Hong Kong defender Tsang Chiu Tat rejoins the club from fellow First Division club Tuen Mun for an undisclosed fee.
 28 January 2014: Hong Kong goalkeeper Zhang Chunhui joins the club after terminating contract with fellow First Division club South China.
 4 February 2014: Spanish midfielder José María Díaz Muñoz joins the club from Thai Division 1 League club Roi Et United on a free transfer.

Players

Squad information

Last update: 7 August 2013
Source: Southern District RSA
Ordered by squad number.
LPLocal player; FPForeign player; NRNon-registered player

Transfers

In

Out

Loan In

Loan out

Club

Coaching staff

Squad statistics

Overall Stats
{|class="wikitable" style="text-align: center;"
|-
!width="100"|
!width="60"|First Division
!width="60"|Senior Shield
!width="60"|FA Cup
!width="60"|Total Stats
|-
|align=left|Games played    ||  16 ||  2  || 1  || 19
|-
|align=left|Games won       ||  4  ||  1  || 1  || 6
|-
|align=left|Games drawn     ||  5  ||  0  || 0  || 5
|-
|align=left|Games lost      ||  7  ||  1  || 0  || 8
|-
|align=left|Goals for       ||  21 ||  4  || 1  || 26
|-
|align=left|Goals against   ||  29 ||  4  || 0  || 33
|- =
|align=left|Players used    ||  24 ||  15 || 14 || 241
|-
|align=left|Yellow cards    ||  46 ||  7  || 5  || 58
|-
|align=left|Red cards       ||  2  ||  1  || 0  || 3
|-

Players Used: Southern has used a total of 24 different players in all competitions.

Squad Stats

Top scorers

Last updated: 19 April 2014

Disciplinary record
Includes all competitive matches. Players listed below made at least one appearance for Southern first squad during the season.

Substitution Record
Includes all competitive matches.

Last updated: 19 April 2014

Captains

Competitions

Overall

First Division League

Classification

Results summary

Results by round

Matches

Pre-season friendlies

First Division League

Senior Shield

FA Cup

Notes

References

Southern District RSA seasons
Sou